Sherpur is a village located about   south of Idar and  north of Himatnagar in Sabarkantha district in the Indian state of Gujarat.

Villages in Sabarkantha district